This is a list of Ghana women's international footballers who have played for the Ghana women's national football team.

Players

See also 
 Ghana women's national football team

References 

 
Lists of Ghana international footballers
Ghana women
Association football player non-biographical articles
Ghana
international